Viorica Susanu (born 29 October 1975 in Galaţi) is a Romanian rower and winner of four Olympic Gold medals.

Susanu rowed in the Romanian women's eight that won the World Rowing Championships in 1997, 1998 and 1999, and the 2000 Summer Olympics. In 2001 and 2002, rowing with Georgeta Damian, she won the World Championships in the women's pair, setting a world's best time in 2002, while continuing to row in the eight. At the 2004 Summer Olympics, she won gold medals in both the pair and the eight, and in 2008 the pair.

Medals at Olympic Games
2000 Summer Olympics
 1st, Women's Eight
2004 Summer Olympics
 1st,  Women's Eight
 1st, Women's Pair
2008 Summer Olympics
 1st, Coxless pair
 3rd, Women's Eight

Medals at World Championships
1997
 1st, Women's Eight
 3rd, Women's Double Sculls
1998
 1st, Women's Eight
1999
 1st, Women's Eight
2001
 1st, Women's Pair
 2nd, Women's Eight
2002
 1st, Women's Pair
2003
 2nd, Women's Eight
 3rd, Women's Pair

References

1975 births
Living people
Sportspeople from Galați
Olympic rowers of Romania
Rowers at the 1996 Summer Olympics
Rowers at the 2000 Summer Olympics
Rowers at the 2004 Summer Olympics
Rowers at the 2008 Summer Olympics
Rowers at the 2012 Summer Olympics
Olympic gold medalists for Romania
Olympic bronze medalists for Romania
Olympic medalists in rowing
Romanian female rowers
Medalists at the 2008 Summer Olympics
Medalists at the 2004 Summer Olympics
Medalists at the 2000 Summer Olympics
European Rowing Championships medalists